Dreamatorium is Buckethead's first album under the anagram name Death Cube K. It was released on May 13, 1994, by Strata (sub-label of Bill Laswell's Subharmonic Records) and again in 1995, including a graphics image generator software by Interactive Multimedia Corporation as the first track. The included software is fractint (version 18.2 for MS-DOS), a freeware fractal generator software that may be obtained as a standalone download from the fractint website free of charge.

Track listing

Credits
Buckethead - guitar
Bill Laswell - bass
Robert Musso - Engineering (with: Layng Martine)
John Matarazzo - Realization
Robert Soares - A&R Coordination
Norman Saul - System Design

References

Buckethead albums
1994 albums
Albums with cover art by Dave McKean
Strata (record label) albums